Jonathan Richard Bradshaw,  (born 15 February 1944) is a British academic, specialising in social policy, poverty and child welfare. He is Professor Emeritus of Social Policy at the University of York and a part-time Professor of Social Policy at Durham University. Since 2013, he has served as chairman of the policy committee of Child Poverty Action Group.

Honours
In 1996, Bradshaw was elected a Fellow of the Academy of Social Sciences (FAcSS). In the 2005 Queen's Birthday Honours, he was appointed Commander of the Order of the British Empire (CBE) 'for services to child poverty'. In 2010, he was elected a Fellow of the British Academy (FBA). The British Academy is the UK's national academy for humanities and social sciences.

Selected works

References

Living people
Academics of social policy
Academics of the University of York
Academics of Durham University
Fellows of the British Academy
Fellows of the Academy of Social Sciences
Commanders of the Order of the British Empire
1944 births